The Urgent Care Association (UCA) is a membership organization founded in 2004 and headquartered in Warrenville, IL, United States, which represents professionals working in urgent care centers in the United States and internationally.

Educational resources
UCA offers educational and professional development resources including live webinars, convention recordings, and self-paced learning content through its online education portal, in addition to providing resources for starting a new urgent care center, provision of clinical care in the urgent care setting, and running a successful urgent care practice.

UCA also holds an annual Convention in coordination with the College of Urgent Care Medicine. Additionally, UCA publishes Benchmarking Reports on emerging trends in the urgent care industry.

Journal of Urgent Care Medicine
The journal features columns on medical coding, legal aspects of urgent care, and occupational medicine matters.

References

External links
 
 Journal of Urgent Care Medicine

Medical associations based in the United States
Medical and health organizations based in Illinois
Organizations established in 2004
2004 establishments in Illinois
Warrenville, Illinois